L'eredità (The inheritance) is an Italian Rai 1 game show. It premiered on 29 July 2002. From 29 July 2002 to 10 June 2006, it was hosted by Italian presenter Amadeus. He was succeeded by Carlo Conti, who hosted the show until 14 April 2014, when he was replaced by Fabrizio Frizzi. Frizzi hosted until 23 October 2017, when he became ill during the taping of the next show and was taken to the hospital. Carlo Conti substituted for Frizzi from 30 October 2017 to 15 December 2017, and he hosted the special episode in tandem with Fabrizio Frizzi when the latter returned to host the quiz. On 16 December 2017, Fabrizio Frizzi resumed hosting the show by himself until 25 March 2018. The next day, Frizzi died of a brain haemorrhage. Following a hiatus due to Frizzi's death, the game returned from 3 April 2018 until the end of the season with the host Carlo Conti. Flavio Insinna has presented the show since 24 September 2018.

The show reached 1,000 episodes on 19 November 2010 and with more than 5,000 episodes, it is the longest-running game show on Italian television. A video game based on the series was developed by Milestone srl and released for the PlayStation 2 and Microsoft Windows in 2003.

On-air talent 

The current on-air talent for L'eredità consists of:

 Flavio Insinna, Presenter
 Andrea Cerelli, Professore (Professor)
 Samira Lui, Professoressa (Professor)

Gameplay

Main game
Each episode features seven contestants, one being a returning champion, who compete to win a jackpot over the course of seven rounds. Only one contestant is allowed to answer a question at a time; if the contestant answers a question correctly, control is passed to the next contestant in a clockwise fashion. Each round continues until two questions are answered incorrectly by one contestant, after which the contestant who gave a second incorrect answer must challenge another contestant to an elimination duel known as the "Scalata Doppia" ("Double Climb"). For the duration of the duel, each contestant has 45 seconds (60 seconds until 18 December 2022) to correctly identify as many words as possible from a standard list of definitions; the first letter of each word is automatically given (with one letter added to the word every two seconds until a correct response is given or until one letter remains), and the contestant in control can make as many guesses as possible (the round is played in a chess clock format). Correctly identifying a word freezes the contestant's timer and passes control to the other contestant. When a contestant has no time left on their clock, they are eliminated from the game and leave with no money; the eliminated contestant's money sum is transferred to the contestant who won the duel.

"Continua tu" (You continue, round 1)
In this first round of the game, since 19 December 2022, instead of the matchup game, and features a single scale of eleven matches of various kinds. Each participant has forty seconds to solve all the pairings, in case of error the conductor communicates the correct answer and the turn passes to the next competitor. Whoever concludes the pairings is immune from elimination and the reigning champion can choose to challenge only two of the five remaining competitors, who will compete for permanence in the programme through the double climb.

"Chi, Come, Cosa" (Who, How, What, round 2)
In this game, proposed in 2022, the contestant must complete the headline of a bizarre news story, choosing between two possible answer options. At the end of the round, the player who has collected two mistakes will be at risk of elimination and will have to play the double climb.

"I Fantastici Quattro" (The Fantastic Four, round 3)
In this round, the host shows four years to the five contestants (from 1920 onwards), and they have to match an event to the correct year. The first contestant to give two incorrect answers is at risk of elimination.

"La parola" (The Word, round 4)
In this round, the four remaining players are offered two little-known words in the Italian language, along with a rotating cylinder containing nine definitions. One at a time, the contestants must determine whether or not the definition fits the assigned word. Each word is played until the correct definition is given; the player who completes the definition first automatically advances to the next round. Two such words are played in this round; the two players who did not solve any definitions must face off against each other in the elimination duel for the final spot in the next round.

"Il Triello" (round 5)
In this round, the three contestants have to answer seven questions in seven categories. Every question has a value between €10,000 and €30,000. The player has ten seconds to answer a question with four options. If he/she misses or runs out of time, the game passes to another contestant who, if he/she answers correctly, adds the amount of that question to his/her total. At the end of the game, the two contestants with the highest totals advance to the sixth round. In the event of a tie for the last place at the end of this round, the two tied contestants have to face off against each other for the third spot in that round (with the time limit reduced to 30 seconds); a tie between all three competitors for first place must be broken by having two contestants face off against each other at a time, with the loser of the first duel facing off against the contestant who gave the last correct answer in the round during the second duel.

From the 2019–2020 season onwards, a mystery option associated with an unknown category was added (indicated onscreen by a question mark) where the competitor who chooses this option, once the matter has been disclosed, can decide whether to assign a value of €20,000 (two options), €40,000 (three options), or €60,000 (all four options) to the question. Only the contestant who selected the mystery category can play the question; if they answer correctly, they add the value to their jackpot, whereas if they answer incorrectly, the question is discarded, with the value of the question being equally divided between the other two challengers, thus €10,000 each if the question had two answers, €20,000 each if it had three and €30,000 if all four answers were shown. Furthermore, the three competitors who qualify for the "Triello" acquire the right to return for the next episode, with the winner of the next round being immune from the first round of the next game. From the 2022-2023 edition, the two competitors with the highest prize pool qualify for the next game.

"La stoccata" (The Jab, round 6)
In this round, introduced from the 2022-2023 season, replacing the 2 Steps, the two finalist contestants must answer a series of questions in order to enter the final game. The one who has the highest jackpot starts playing first and, between two possible questions, he has to choose the question to play with his opponent, who after reading the three answer options is forced to answer. If the opponent gives the correct answer he will earn a point, otherwise, he will give a point to his challenger.

At the end of the round, the competitor who has scored two points will go to the final game.

"La Ghigliottina" (The Guillotine, round 7)
The final round, which was introduced in the 2005–06 season, was the idea of Stefano Santucci, the creator of the show. The contestant is presented with five pairs of words (one pair at a time), of which only one in each pair is the correct word. The jackpot is retained for every correct response and is halved for every incorrect response. Once all five pairs are played, the contestant is given 60 seconds to study the five correct words and then must write a word that bears a thematic connection to the other five words. If the word that was written is identical to the word on the host's card, the contestant wins all of the prize money they have retained; if the word does not match the one on the host's card, the contestant leaves empty-handed and returns to the next episode.

Game history 
In the table sorted below, the order in which each game is played is denoted by a number, while "P" indicates a game that was played as a preliminary round prior to the start of the main game.

International versions 
This game is an Italian adaptation of the Argentinian game show El legado created by Marcelo Ferrero aired on Telefe and sold all over the world, particularly in Latin American countries.

All the international versions except the French and the original are inspired by the Italian version.

  Currently airing
  No longer airing
  Non-broadcast pilot

References

External links 

 Full episodes of L'eredità

2000s game shows
2002 Italian television series debuts
2010s game shows
Italian game shows
RAI original programming